Gurten is a municipality in the district of Ried im Innkreis in the Austrian state of Upper Austria.

Geography
Gurten lies in the Innviertel. About 28 percent of the municipality is forest, and 66 percent is farmland.

References

Cities and towns in Ried im Innkreis District